Fan Zhendong (born 22 January 1997) is a Chinese professional table tennis player who is currently ranked world No. 1 for men's singles by the International Table Tennis Federation (ITTF). After joining the Chinese National Table Tennis Team in 2012 as the youngest member of the team, he went on to become the youngest ITTF World Tour Champion and the youngest World Table Tennis Champion. He achieved the top spot in the world rankings after holding position No. 2 for 29 consecutive months, starting from November 2015.

Fan's attacking style of play involves explosive footwork and powerful forehand loops. His thick-set build has led fans and commentators to affectionately refer to him as "Little Fatty". His continuous rise to becoming one of the top table tennis players in the world has garnered him a large fanbase worldwide, with over half a million followers on Chinese social media site Weibo. In 2016, he won the ITTF Star Point Award, and he was nominated for the Best Male Star Award every year between 2013 and 2016.

Playing style and equipment
Fan was a Stiga sponsored athlete. However, he changed to Butterfly Fan Zhendong ALC, He uses a black DHS Hurricane 3 neo National Blue Sponge for forehand and a Red Tenergy 05 for backhand. During the 2019 world table tennis championships, he changed to the new Butterfly Dignics 05 on his backhand that had just been released on 1 April 2019. Butterfly announced its signing of Fan Zhendong on November 1, 2021.

A right-handed shakehand-grip player, Fan plays an attacking style of table tennis using his explosive footwork and thunderous forehand loops to finish off his opponents. Emerging as a 16-year-old wunderkind, Fan's playing style is often compared to his senior compatriot Ma Long. In addition to being trained by national team coaches, he has been specially trained by both Wang Hao and Ma Lin. His encounters against senior players in the Chinese national team have drawn much speculation and anticipation. His fearlessness and technique allow him to challenge highly rated, experienced players, sometimes even beating top players in thrilling style.

Career

2021
In May, Fan played in the Chinese Olympic Scrimmages. He won all his group matches 3–0 and defeated 16-year-old break-out star Lin Shidong, who defeated Xu Xin in the group stage, 4–2 in the quarter-finals. Because of Lin's similarity to Fan, he received the nickname "Little Little Fatty" by Chinese netizens. Fan defeated Wang Chuqin in the semi-finals, but lost to the dark horse champion Zhou Qihao in the finals. Fan was selected alongside Ma Long to represent China in the men's singles event at the Tokyo Olympics. Fan won the second leg of the Chinese Olympic Scrimmage, coming back from down 8–4 and 3–1 in games to defeat Xu Xin in the finals. Fan noted that his selection onto the Olympic team helped him focus better on his training and play better in the second leg compared to the first leg. Zhou again upset Fan in a closed-door scrimmage in June.

Although Ma Long called Fan the favorite before their Olympic finals match-up, Ma ended up upsetting Fan 4-2 in the Olympic finals, giving Ma the gold medal and Fan the silver. Despite the loss, Fan Zhendong still showed class, acknowledging Ma Long's control of the match and recognizing his own missed opportunities. When asked about Ma Long's place in history, Fan acknowledged that he is the greatest in their generation.

In September, Fan saved six match points to beat Ma Long deuce in the fifth in the finals of the team event at the China National Games. Fan's win over Ma delivered Team Guangdong the gold medal. Fan Zhendong also won the gold in the men's singles event.

Playing style
In 2021, Timo Boll stated that he felt that he and Fan played a similar style except that Fan was better. Boll did not elaborate further.

Fan raises his elbow higher on his strokes compared to some of his contemporaries such as Ma Long, resulting in a stronger backhand-forehand transition game at the expense of a more vulnerable middle.

Achievements

 ITTF World Tour Grand Finals

See also
 List of Youth Olympic Games gold medalists who won Olympic gold medals

References

External links

Fan Zhendong at Table Tennis Media

1997 births
Living people
Chinese male table tennis players
Asian Games medalists in table tennis
Table tennis players at the 2014 Asian Games
Table tennis players at the 2018 Asian Games
Table tennis players at the 2014 Summer Youth Olympics
Asian Games gold medalists for China
Asian Games silver medalists for China
Medalists at the 2014 Asian Games
Medalists at the 2018 Asian Games
Table tennis players from Guangzhou
World Table Tennis Championships medalists
Youth Olympic gold medalists for China
Olympic table tennis players of China
Medalists at the 2020 Summer Olympics
Olympic gold medalists for China
Olympic silver medalists for China
Table tennis players at the 2020 Summer Olympics
Olympic medalists in table tennis